The Browns–Steelers rivalry is a National Football League (NFL) rivalry between the Cleveland Browns and the Pittsburgh Steelers. With 138 meetings it is the oldest rivalry and the most storied in the American Football Conference. The two divisional foes have a natural rivalry due to the commonalities between the cities, proximity, etc. It is sometimes called the Turnpike Rivalry or Turnpike War because the majority of the driving route between the two cities are via the Ohio and Pennsylvania Turnpikes.

As such, they usually play twice every regular season.

The Steelers lead the overall series, 80–62–1. The teams have met three times in the playoffs, with the Steelers holding a 2–1 advantage.

Similarities between the cities

The rivalry was primarily fueled by the close proximity between the two cities, as Cleveland and Pittsburgh are roughly 135 miles apart. Many fans make the two-hour drive by car to away games. The city of Youngstown, Ohio is roughly located halfway between the two cities and is within the 75-mile blackout radius for both teams. The Youngstown television market has dual rights to both teams. WKBN-TV broadcasts both teams; when they play at the same time the station chooses one game, and gets many calls from disappointed fans of the other team. The Youngstown area fan base remains roughly split 50/50 between the Steelers and Browns.

Businesses
In recent times, Pittsburgh-area businesses have entered the Cleveland market by buying out local Cleveland-area competitors such as Giant Eagle, Dollar Bank, Howard Hanna Realty, and PNC Financial Services acquisition of National City Corp. Among other reasons, some Clevelanders didn't like the idea of a Pittsburgh-based bank buying National City because of the rivalry between the Browns and Steelers. PNC and Giant Eagle are official team sponsors for both teams. In addition, natural expansion has occurred with companies with Western Pennsylvania roots with Vocelli Pizza and Altoona-based Sheetz making successful expansions into the Cleveland market.

Conversely, Eaton Corporation was founded in Cleveland and has long had significant operations in Pittsburgh.  Forest City Enterprises owns billions of dollars of Pittsburgh-area real estate.  The Cleveland branch of the Federal Reserve includes Pittsburgh in its territory.  Cleveland-based Sherwin-Williams has locations throughout Pittsburgh and nationally is one of the top competitors to Pittsburgh-based PPG Industries. Two former Cleveland-based businesses, Picway Shoes and Revco, had locations throughout Pittsburgh before being bought out by Payless ShoeSource in 1994 and CVS/pharmacy in 1998, respectively. National City Bank itself had expanded into Pittsburgh in 1995 through its acquisition of Integra Bank and actually caused antitrust problems when PNC bought National City in 2008, being forced to divest 61 National City branches in Western Pennsylvania. Although First Niagara Bank ultimately bought 57 of the branches, Cleveland-based KeyBank was one of the banks that was considering buying the branches and expanding into Pittsburgh; KeyBank would later acquire First Niagara outright.

Republic Steel, which was based in Cleveland, was the company that suggested to the Steelers that the team use the Steelmark logo on its helmets in 1962. The logo later became the Steelers primary trademark, and is arguably better known with the logo than the steel industry itself.

Coaches and players
The teams have also had various prominent players and coaches with roots in the other team. For instance, former Steelers head coach Chuck Noll is from Cleveland and played linebacker for the Browns. His successor as head coach, Bill Cowher, also played linebacker and special teams for the Browns, and was an assistant coach for the Browns from 1985 to 1988. Cowher was born and raised in Crafton, a suburb of Pittsburgh. Former Browns head coach Marty Schottenheimer is a native of Pittsburgh area suburb Canonsburg, along with his brother Kurt Schottenheimer, who was the Browns special teams coach from 1987 to 1988. Another Browns head coach, Bud Carson also had as his hometown a northern suburb of Pittsburgh and was a longtime Steelers coordinator under Chuck Noll.

Steelers Hall of Famer Jack Lambert is a native Ohioan and attended Kent State University, as did Akron, Ohio native James Harrison. Steelers quarterback Ben Roethlisberger hails from Findlay, Ohio. Former punter Chris Gardocki played for three years for the Steelers, including the Super Bowl XL championship team, after playing five seasons with the Browns from 1999 to 2003. Former Steelers Offensive coordinator Bruce Arians held the same position with the Browns from 2001 to 2003.

History of the rivalry

1950s and 1960s:  Browns Dominance

The Browns and Steelers first met in 1950, the Browns' first NFL season after dominating the All-America Football Conference. The Browns continued their dominance in the NFL as they appeared in six straight NFL Championship games from 1950 to 1955, winning the NFL title in 1950, 1954, and 1955.  During that time the Steelers were among the NFL's worst teams.

The Browns won the first meeting on October 7, 30–17 as they forced six Steelers turnovers. Later that season in Cleveland, the Browns won in a blowout, 45–7. The Steelers won 55–27 in a game in which Ray Matthews had 150 receiving yards and three touchdowns.

The Browns continued their dominance throughout the late 1950s and 1960s, marked by several strong rushing performances by Browns Hall of Fame running back Jim Brown. The Browns would hold a 31–9 series advantage through the first two decades of the rivalry.

1970s:  Steelers Super Bowl run

After the NFL merged with the former American Football League (AFL) in 1970, the Browns and Steelers were placed in the Central division of the newly formed American Football Conference (AFC).  The Browns and Steelers, along with the Baltimore Colts were placed in the AFC with the former members of the AFL to allow each conference to have the same number of teams.  The NFL tried to move the Steelers to the new conference, but then-Steelers owner Art Rooney initially refused. However, Rooney reconsidered after then-Browns owner Art Modell volunteered the Browns to shift to the AFC, partly because the NFL had offered $3 million as an incentive to move but also because of the potential for an intrastate rivalry with the AFL's Cincinnati Bengals.  The financial boost combined with the prospect of losing his most lucrative division rival quickly persuaded Rooney to join Modell in the AFC in order to continue their own rivalry, although the team did lose its in-state rivalry with the Philadelphia Eagles as a result.

In the 1970s the Steelers began to even the playing field with the Browns, led by head coach Chuck Noll, a Cleveland native and former Browns linebacker. By then, the rivalry between the two clubs was more hostile and personal, as evident in the 1976 matchup at Cleveland Municipal Stadium, when Joe "Turkey" Jones tackled Terry Bradshaw with a pile-driving sack. Bradshaw suffered a neck injury from the play, and the footage of the sack has since become immortalized in NFL Films as part of the rivalry.

The Steelers opened Three Rivers Stadium in 1970 and won their first sixteen meetings with the Browns at that venue.  During the 1970s, the teams each won five of the ten meetings in Cleveland.  The Steelers ended the 1970s winning seven straight meetings and capped the decade by winning Super Bowls XIII and XIV to go along with their Super Bowl wins earlier in the decade (IX and X).

1980s and 1990s
The teams exchanged victories throughout the 1980s. In the first meeting of the decade, the Browns, led by quarterback Brian Sipe, overcame a 12-point deficit to stun the Steelers 27–26. The Steelers would defeat the Browns later that year in another close game. The 1980 Browns, nicknamed the "Kardiac Kids", would make the playoffs that year for the first time since 1972 after Pittsburgh dominated the AFC Central with four Super Bowl wins in the late 1970s.

The Browns ended a 16-game losing streak at Three Rivers Stadium with a 27–24 victory in 1986.  This was the first of four straight Browns wins in Pittsburgh from 1986 to 1989.  In the 1989 season opener, the Browns defeated the Steelers 51–0 in Pittsburgh. This is the largest margin of victory in the rivalry and the worst loss in Steelers franchise history.

While the two exchanged victories in the '70s and '80s, by the 1990s the Steelers became the dominant team in the rivalry. Since the Browns' last series sweep in 1988, the Steelers achieved an overwhelming 39–11 mark against the Browns, enough that in 2007, the Steelers took over the lead in the all-time series (which they currently lead at 72–58) for the first time. This included six straight wins from 1993 to 1995 that featured a 29–9 win in the 1994 divisional playoff game, the first playoff meeting between the two rivals. During most of this time, Bill Cowher was head coach of the Steelers. Cowher, a native of the Pittsburgh suburb of Crafton, also played linebacker for the Browns (though unlike Noll, Cowher mostly played special teams), and also served as an assistant in Cleveland under Marty Schottenheimer, himself another Pittsburgh area native.

After the 1995 season, the rivalry took a brief hiatus due to the Browns relocation to Baltimore. When the league was voting on the Browns relocation, Steelers owner Dan Rooney was one of only two owners to vote against the move. In tribute of Cleveland losing the Browns, Steelers fans wore orange arm bands to the final game at Three Rivers Stadium as a sign of mutual respect and sorrow for losing a great rivalry. While Browns fans still consider the Steelers as their main rival, most Steelers fans consider their rivalry with the Baltimore Ravens the spiritual successor to this rivalry due to Art Modell moving the franchise to Baltimore and renaming them "Ravens". The consistently poor Browns' teams since their expansion in 1999, along with the one-sidedness of the rivalry since then is also a factor in the rivalry having diminished in the views of football fans.

1999–2003: Browns rejoin the NFL
The name "Browns" returned to the NFL in  attached to a new expansion team.  They played their first game against the Steelers at the new Cleveland Browns Stadium.  The Steelers dominated the game 43–0 in a game in which the new Browns could only gain two first downs.  However, in the return fixture in Pittsburgh later that season, the new Browns would defeat the Steelers 16–15 on a last-second Phil Dawson field goal.

The Browns and Steelers would again split the series in 2000, with each team winning in their home stadium.

The two teams would meet in a 2002 wild card playoff game. Browns starting quarterback Tim Couch, however, was ruled out due to a broken leg he suffered in their regular season finale. As a result, backup QB Kelly Holcomb started.  The Browns built a 24–7 lead in the third quarter, but the Steelers came back to win 36–33. In 2003, the Browns would win their first game at Heinz Field, defeating the Steelers 33–13. This was the Browns’ only win at Heinz Field until the 2020 playoffs.

2004-2021: The Ben Roethlisberger era
The Steelers drafted QB Ben Roethlisberger, a native of Findlay, Ohio, in the first round of the 2004 NFL Draft. Roethlisberger became the Steelers' starting quarterback in his rookie year and led the Steelers to three Super Bowl appearances, including wins in Super Bowls XL and XLIII. During Roethlisberger's tenure, the Steelers have amassed a 29–6–1 record against the Browns including a 17–1 mark at home. The Steelers have made 11 playoff appearances including three trips to the Super Bowl and two Super Bowl titles, while the Browns have only made one playoff appearance in this stretch.

In Week 11 of 2006, the Steelers managed to tie the series at 55 games apiece between them and the Browns.  They stunned the Browns 24-20 after Browns QB Charlie Frye's Hail Mary fell incomplete.  The loss also left the Browns to finish last place in the division behind the Steelers.

This was the first time the Steelers led the series and the Steelers have not given the lead up since. Later that season, the Steelers came back from down 21–6 to win 31–28. The two teams finished the season at 10–6, tied atop the AFC North. The Steelers won the head-to-head tiebreaker, while the Browns failed to earn a wild card spot after losing a tiebreaker to the Tennessee Titans.

On December 10, the Browns defeated the Steelers 13–6, ending a 12-game winning streak for the Steelers.

Roethlisberger continued his dominance of the Browns in the 2010s, going 12–1–1 against them in the decade. However, the majority of the games have been close and come down to the final minutes or one final play. 

In Week 5 of the 2014 season, the 2–2 Browns routed the 3–2 Steelers in a 31–10 victory in Cleveland after suffering a narrow 30–27 loss to Pittsburgh in the season opener. The Steelers scored early with a field goal and kept the Browns scoreless in the first quarter. The Browns would dominate from the second quarter onward, however, and this win would propel the Browns to an eventual 6–3 record atop the AFC North. However, injuries and rookie QB Johnny Manziel's poor play would doom the Browns’ season, where they would finish with a 7–9 record while the Steelers won the division.  The Browns' struggles continued and the team reached rock bottom in 2016 and 2017, as they went 1–31 in those two seasons combined.

On September 9, the teams played to a 21–21 tie. This marked the first tie game in the history of the rivalry. The game saw the Steelers jump to a 21–7 lead, but the Browns mounted two successful drives to tie the game at 21–21 and send it to overtime. The Steelers committed 6 turnovers against a strong Browns defense, and Browns DE Myles Garrett was able to sack Roethlisberger three times in their first meeting. Going into overtime, Steelers kicker Chris Boswell missed a potential game-winning field goal. On a subsequent drive after a Browns 3-and-out, Roethlisberger had his 5th turnover of the game, a fumble recovered by Browns linebacker Joe Schobert. A field goal try by the Browns in the last seconds of overtime was blocked, resulting in the tie. The tie would come back to hurt the Steelers as they would finish 9–6–1, a half game behind the Baltimore Ravens for the AFC North title (had the Steelers won this game, they would have finished 10–6, tied with the Ravens, and would have won the tiebreaker). The Steelers missed the playoffs for the first time since 2013.

On November 14, 2019, Browns quarterback Baker Mayfield notched his first win over the Steelers with a 21–7 victory, the Browns’ first win in the series since 2014. However, in the final seconds of the game, a brawl broke out between the two teams. With eight seconds remaining in the game, Browns DE Myles Garrett tackled Steelers QB Mason Rudolph after the latter completed a screen pass to RB Trey Edmunds. Rudolph had choice words for Garrett and unsuccessfully tried to pull Garrett's helmet off. Garrett then ripped off Rudolph's helmet and used it to hit Rudolph in the head while being restrained by Steelers C Maurkice Pouncey and Steelers G David DeCastro. Pouncey then jumped into the brawl by punching and kicking Garrett in the head several times. Browns DT Larry Ogunjobi was also involved in the scuffle by pushing Rudolph to the ground. Garrett, Ogunjobi, and Pouncey were ejected from the game. Following the game, Garrett was suspended for 6 games while Pouncey and Ogunjobi received 2-game and 1-game suspensions, respectively. Garrett's suspension was the longest in NFL history for a single on-field transgression. On December 1, the teams met in Pittsburgh, in a game in which the winner would remain in the thick of the AFC wild card race and the loser would fall further behind. The Steelers, who had benched Rudolph in favor of third string Devlin Hodges, won 20–13 to improve to 7–5 while the Browns fell to 5–7, two games out of a playoff spot.

On January 3, 2021, the Browns entered Week 17 at home and would clinch a playoff spot with a win over the Steelers. The Steelers rested a few of their starters, with Rudolph starting as quarterback. The Browns won 24–22 despite a late Steelers rally; the Browns stopped a Pittsburgh two-point conversion attempt that would have tied the game. The win meant that the 11–5 Browns clinched the 6-seed and faced the Steelers in Pittsburgh for a rematch in the Wild Card Round. Prior to the playoff game, Steelers wide receiver JuJu Smith-Schuster was quoted as saying "The Browns is [sic] the Browns," implying they were the "same old Browns" and calling them "nameless grey faces." Several Cleveland players took Smith-Schuster's comments personally. Despite losing several coaches, including head coach Kevin Stefanski due to COVID-19, the Browns forced five Steelers turnovers, led 28–0 in the first quarter, and won 48–37 to advance to the Divisional Round. This was the Browns' first win at Heinz Field since 2003 and their first ever playoff win against the Steelers.

Season-by-season results

|-
| 
| style="| 
| style="| Browns  45–7
| style="| Browns  30–17
| Browns  2–0
| Browns join the NFL.  First ever meetings between the two teams.  Steelers commit six turnovers in the game in Pittsburgh.  Browns win 1950 NFL Championship Game.
|-
| 
| style="| 
| style="| Browns  17–0
| style="| Browns  28–0
| Browns  4–0
| Browns lose 1951 NFL Championship Game.
|-
| 
| style="| 
| style="| Browns  29–28
| style="| Browns  21–20
| Browns  6–0
| Steelers nearly come back from down 29–7 late in the game in Cleveland but fall one point short.  Browns lose 1952 NFL Championship Game.
|-
| 
| style="| 
| style="| Browns  34–16
| style="| Browns  20–16
| Browns   8–0
| Browns win eight straight meetings, lose 1953 NFL Championship Game.
|-
| 
| Tie 1–1
| style="| Browns  42–7
| style="| Steelers  55–27
| Browns  9–1
| Steelers win first game over Browns.  Browns win 1954 NFL Championship Game.
|-
| 
| style="| 
| style="| Browns  41–14
| style="| Browns  30–7
| Browns  11–1
| Browns win 1955 NFL Championship.
|-
| 
| Tie 1–1
| style="| Steelers  24–16
| style="| Browns  14–10
| Browns  12–2
|
|-
| 
| style="| 
| style="| Browns  24–0
| style="| Browns  23–12
| Browns  14–2
|
|-
| 
| style="| 
| style="| Browns  27–10
| style="| Browns  45–12
| Browns  16–2
| Browns force nine Steelers turnovers in the game in Pittsburgh.
|-
| 
| style="| 
| style="| Steelers  21–20
| style="| Steelers  17–7
| Browns  16–4
| Steelers' first sweep of the Browns.
|-

|-
| 
| Tie 1–1
| style="| Browns  28–20
| style="| Steelers  14–10
| Browns  17–5
|
|-
| 
| Tie 1–1
| style="| Steelers  17–13
| style="| Browns  30–28
| Browns  18–6
| Buddy Dial sets a Steelers franchise record (since broken) with 235 receiving yards in the game in Pittsburgh.
|-
| 
| style="| 
| style="| Browns  35–14
| style="| Browns  41–14
| Browns  20–6
| Steelers move to Pitt Stadium.
|-
| 
| Tie 1–1
| style="| Browns  35–23
| style="| Steelers  9–7
| Browns  21–7
|
|-
| 
| Tie 1–1
| style="| Steelers  23–7
| style="| Browns  30–17
| Browns  22–8
| Browns win 1964 NFL Championship Game.
|-
| 
| style="| 
| style="| Browns  24–19
| style="| Browns  42–21
| Browns  24–8
|
|-
| 
| Tie 1–1
| style="| Browns  41–10
| style="| Steelers  16–6
| Browns  25–9
| Steelers intercept five Frank Ryan passes in game in Pittsburgh.
|-
| 
| style="| Browns 2–0
| style="| Browns  21–10
| style="| Browns  34–14
| Browns  27–9
|
|-
| 
| style="| Browns 2–0
| style="| Browns  31–24
| style="| Browns  45–24
| Browns  29–9
| Browns defense intercepts six Steelers passes in game in Pittsburgh.
|-
| 
| style="| Browns 2–0
| style="| Browns  42–31
| style="| Browns  24–3
| Browns  31–9
|

|-
| 
| Tie 1–1
| style="| Browns  15–7
| style="| Steelers  28–9
| Browns  32–10
| AFL-NFL merger.  Both teams placed in AFC Central. Steelers open Three Rivers Stadium.
|-
| 
| Tie 1–1
| style="| Browns  27–17
| style="| Steelers  26–9
| Browns  33–11
|
|-
| 
| Tie 1–1
| style="| Browns  26–24
| style="| Steelers  30–0
| Browns  34–12
|
|-
| 
| Tie 1–1
| style="| Browns  21–16
| style="| Steelers  33–6
| Browns  35–13
| Browns win nine straight home meetings. 
|-
| 
| style="| 
| style="| Steelers  26–16
| style="| Steelers  20–16
| Browns  35–15
| Steelers win Super Bowl IX.
|-
| 
| style="| 
| style="| Steelers  42–6
| style="| Steelers  31–17
| Browns  35–17
| Steelers DT "Mean" Joe Greene ejected for kicking Browns OL Bob McKay in groin in game in Cleveland.  Steelers win Super Bowl X.
|-
| 
| Tie 1–1
| style="| Browns  18–16
| style="| Steelers  31–14
| Browns  36–18
|
|-
| 
| style="| 
| style="| Steelers  28–14
| style="| Steelers  35–31
| Browns  36–20
|
|-
| 
| style="| 
| style="| Steelers  34–14
| style="| Steelers  15–9(OT)
| Browns  36–22
| First overtime game in the history of the rivalry.  In the game in Cleveland, Steelers LB Jack Lambert is ejected for throwing punches at Browns QB Brian Sipe and other players.  In a Howard Cosell interview the next week Lambert comments on the now much quoted event as "Quarterbacks should wear dresses."  Steelers win Super Bowl XIII.
|-
| 
| style="| 
| style="| Steelers  51–35
| style="| Steelers  33–30(OT)
| Browns  36–24
| Game in Cleveland is the highest scoring game in the rivalry (86 points).  Steelers win Super Bowl XIV.
|-

|-
| 
| Tie 1–1
| style="| Browns  27–26
| style="| Steelers  16–13
| Browns  37–25
| Browns overcome a 26–14 fourth-quarter deficit with two late Brian Sipe touchdowns, while Steelers win their home game with a Terry Bradshaw pass to Lynn Swann with 11 seconds remaining.  The 1980 Browns were nicknamed the "Kardiac Kids" due to many close games, including these two.
|-
| 
| style="| 
| style="| Steelers  32–10
| style="| Steelers  13–7
| Browns  37–27
|
|-
| 
| Tie 1–1
| style="| Browns  10–9
| style="| Steelers  37–21
| Browns  38–28
| Both games played despite players' strike reducing the season to nine games.  Browns DB Hanford Dixon intercepts three Steelers passes including two in the final minutes in the game in Cleveland.
|-
| 
| Tie 1–1
| style="| Browns  30–17
| style="| Steelers  44–17
| Browns  39–29
|
|-
| 
| Tie 1–1
| style="| Browns  20–10
| style="| Steelers  23–20
| Browns  40–30
|
|-
| 
| Tie 1–1
| style="| Browns  17–7
| style="| Steelers  10–9
| Browns  41–31
| Steelers win 16th straight home meeting.
|-
| 
| style="| Browns 2–0
| style="| Browns  37–31(OT)
| style="| Browns  27–24
| Browns  43–31
| Browns' first win at Three Rivers Stadium (they had been 0–16).
|-
| 
| style="| Browns 2–0
| style="| Browns  34–10
| style="| Browns  19–14
| Browns  45–31
| Browns clinch AFC Central in final game of the season in Pittsburgh.
|-
| 
| style="| Browns 2–0
| style="| Browns  27–7
| style="| Browns  23–9
| Browns  47–31
| Browns most recent season sweep of Steelers.
|-
| 
| Tie 1–1
| style="| Steelers  17–7
| style="| Browns  51–0
| Browns  48–32
| Browns' 51–0 win is the largest margin of victory in the rivalry's history, as well as the Steeler's worst loss in franchise history.
|-

|-
| 
| Tie 1–1
| style="| Browns  13–3
| style="| Steelers  35–0
| Browns  49–33
|
|-
| 
| Tie 1–1
| style="| Browns  17–14
| style="| Steelers  17–10
| Browns  50–34
|
|-
| 
| Tie 1–1
| style="| Browns  17–9
| style="| Steelers  23–13
| Browns  51–35
|
|-
| 
| Tie 1–1
| style="| Browns  28–23
| style="| Steelers  16–9
| Browns  52–36
| Browns PR Eric Metcalf returns two punts for TDs in Cleveland, including the game-winner in the final minutes.
|-
| 
| style="| 
| style="| Steelers  17–10
| style="| Steelers  17–7
| Browns  52–38
|
|- style="background:#f2f2f2; font-weight:bold;"
|  1994 Playoffs
| style="| 
| 
| style="| Steelers  29–9
|  Browns  52–39
|  AFC Divisional Round, first playoff meeting between the two teams.
|-
| 
| style="| 
| style="| Steelers  20–17
| style="| Steelers  20–3
| Browns  52–41
| Final season before the Browns move to Baltimore.  At the game in Pittsburgh, Steelers fans wear orange and brown armbands as a tribute to the seeming end of the rivalry.  Steelers lose in Super Bowl XXX.
|-
|colspan="6" |No games from 1996-1998 as the Browns suspended operations
|-
| 
| Tie 1–1
| style="| Steelers  43–0
| style="| Browns  16–15
| Browns  53–42
| Browns return to the NFL and open FirstEnergy Stadium (then known as Cleveland Browns Stadium). Game in Cleveland was the first game for the expansion Browns.  Browns win the game in Pittsburgh on a Phil Dawson field goal as time expires.
|-

|-
| 
| Tie 1–1
| style="| Browns  23–20
| style="| Steelers  22–0
| Browns  54–43
|
|-
| 
| style="| 
| style="| Steelers  15–12(OT)
| style="| Steelers  28–7
| Browns  54–45
| Steelers open Heinz Field.
|-
| 
| style="| 
| style="| Steelers  23–20
| style="| Steelers  16–13(OT)
| Browns  54–47
|
|- style="background:#f2f2f2; font-weight:bold;"
|  2002 Playoffs
| style="| 
| 
| style="| Steelers  36–33
|  Browns  54–48
|  AFC Wild Card Round, Steelers come back from down 24–7 in the 3rd quarter.
|-
| 
| Tie 1–1
| style="| Steelers  13–6
| style="| Browns  33–13
| Browns  55–49
| To date, this is the Browns only regular season win at Heinz Field.
|-
| 
| style="| 
| style="| Steelers  24–10
| style="| Steelers  34–23
| Browns  55–51
|
|-
| 
| style="| 
| style="| Steelers  41–0
| style="| Steelers  34–21
| Browns  55–53
| Steelers win Super Bowl XL.
|-
| 
| style="| 
| style="| Steelers  24–20
| style="| Steelers  27–7
| Tie  55–55
| Steelers win in Cleveland on a last minute Ben Roethlisberger touchdown pass to Willie Parker.
|-
| 
| style="| 
| style="| Steelers  34–7
| style="| Steelers  31–28
| Steelers  57–55
| Steelers take first ever lead in the overall series (a lead which they have yet to relinquish).  Both teams finished the season 10–6, tied for the AFC North lead, but the Steelers won the division on the head-to-head tiebreaker.
|-
| 
| style="| 
| style="| Steelers  10–6
| style="| Steelers  31–0
| Steelers  59–55
| Steelers win Super Bowl XLIII.
|-
| 
|Tie 1–1
| style="| Browns  13–6
| style="| Steelers  27–14
| Steelers  60–56
| Steelers win 12 straight meetings (2003–09).
|-

|-
| 
| style="| 
| style="| Steelers  41–9
| style="| Steelers  28–10
| Steelers  62–56
| Steelers lose in Super Bowl XLV.
|-
| 
| style="| 
| style="| Steelers  14–3
| style="| Steelers  13–9
| Steelers  64–56
|
|-
| 
| Tie 1–1
| style="| Browns  20–14
| style="| Steelers  24–10
| Steelers  65–57
| Browns force eight Steelers turnovers in game in Cleveland.
|-
| 
| style="| 
| style="| Steelers  27–11
| style="| Steelers  20–7
| Steelers  67–57
|
|-
| 
| Tie 1–1
| style="| Browns  31–10
| style="| Steelers  30–27
| Steelers  68–58
| In the game in Pittsburgh, Browns come back from down 27–3 in the 3rd quarter to tie the game at 27, but the Steelers kick a game winning field goal.
|-
| 
| style="| 
| style="| Steelers  28–12
| style="| Steelers  30–9
| Steelers  70–58
| 
|-
| 
| style="| 
| style="| Steelers  24–9
| style="| Steelers  27–24(OT)
| Steelers  72–58
|
|-
| 
| style="| 
| style="| Steelers  21–18
| style="| Steelers  28–24
| Steelers  74–58
| Browns complete the second 0–16 season in NFL history, which was completed by the Steelers' home win.
|-
| 
| style="| 
| Tie  21–21(OT)
| style="| Steelers  33–18
| Steelers  75–58–1
| First tie game in the history of the rivalry.  Both teams missed field goals in the final two minutes of overtime that would have won the game. 
|-
| 
| Tie 1–1
| style="| Browns  21–7
| style="| Steelers  20–13
| Steelers  76–59–1
| Game in Cleveland featured a brawl involving Mason Rudolph, Myles Garrett, Larry Ogunjobi and Maurkice Pouncey.  All but Rudolph were ejected and subsequently suspended.
|-

|-
| 
| Tie 1–1
| style="| Browns  24–22
| style="| Steelers  38–7
| Steelers  77–60–1
| Steelers win 17 straight home meetings (2004–2020). Browns clinch first playoff berth since 2002 in their home win in Week 17, setting up a rematch in the Wild Card Round the following week.
|- style="background:#f2f2f2; font-weight:bold;"
|  2020 Playoffs
| style="| Browns 1–0
| 
| style="| Browns  48–37
|  Steelers  77–61–1
|  AFC Wild Card Round.  Browns' first win in Pittsburgh since 2003. Browns win first playoff game since 1994 and first playoff win over the Steelers.  Browns score 28 points in the first quarter, tying an NFL record for a playoff game.  Steelers QB Ben Roethlisberger sets an NFL record with 47 completions in the game.
|-
| 
| style="| 
| style="| Steelers  15–10
| style="| Steelers  26–14
| Steelers  79–61–1
|Final start in the series for Ben Roethlisberger.
|-
| 
| Tie 1–1
| style="| Browns  29–17
| style="| Steelers  28–14
| Steelers  80–62–1
|
|- 

|-
| Regular Season
| style="|
| 
| 
|
|-
| Postseason
| style="|
| no games
| Steelers 2–1
| AFC Wild Card round: 2002, 2020. AFC Divisional round: 1994.
|-
| Regular and postseason
| style="|
| 
| 
| Steelers are 46–7 vs. Browns in Pittsburgh since 1970
|-

Records
 The greatest defeat in Steelers history occurred on September 10,  in Pittsburgh when the Browns won 51–0.
  The game between the Steelers and the Browns is the most played rivalry in the AFC and fifth most played in the NFL.

See also
 Academic Bowl (college football), rivalry between Case Western Reserve University from Cleveland and Carnegie Mellon University from Pittsburgh

References

Further reading

External links
 Browns vs Steelers at pro-football-reference.com
 Cleveland vs Pittsburgh  at afc-north.com

Cleveland Browns
Pittsburgh Steelers
National Football League rivalries
Pittsburgh Steelers rivalries
Cleveland Browns rivalries